Binary subcomplexes in proteins database (BISC) is a protein–protein interaction database about binary subcomplexes.

References

External links
  

Biochemistry databases
Proteomics
Biophysics organizations
Systems biology